Anantham Ajnatham is a 1983 Indian Malayalam film, directed by K. P. Jayan.  The film has musical score by M. K. Arjunan.

Cast

Soundtrack
The music was composed by M. K. Arjunan and the lyrics were written by M. N. Thankappan.

References

External links
 

1983 films
1980s Malayalam-language films